Cooper Memorial Church (also known as Cooper Memorial United Methodist Church) is a historic church at 9900 Cooper Church Drive in Okolona, Louisville, Kentucky, United States. It was built in 1896 and added to the National Register of Historic Places in 1980.

It is built of red brick in a simple Gothic Revival style.  It is the third church building of the congregation, which was organized in about 1812.

References

External links
Official website

United Methodist churches in Kentucky
Churches on the National Register of Historic Places in Kentucky
Gothic Revival church buildings in Kentucky
Churches completed in 1896
19th-century Methodist church buildings in the United States
Churches in Louisville, Kentucky
National Register of Historic Places in Louisville, Kentucky
19th-century buildings and structures in Louisville, Kentucky
1896 establishments in Kentucky